The Tsar Bell, also known as the Tsarsky Kolokol, Tsar Kolokol III, or Royal Bell, is a ,  bell on display on the grounds of the Moscow Kremlin. The bell was commissioned by Empress Anna Ivanovna, niece of Peter the Great.

It has never been in working order, suspended, or rung.

The present bell is sometimes referred to as Kolokol III (Bell III), because it is the third generation.

General description
The Tsar Bell is located between the Ivan the Great Bell Tower and the Kremlin Wall. Made of bell bronze, the bell cracked during a fire after being completed and has never been rung. The broken piece weighs . 

The bell is decorated with relief images of baroque angels, plants, oval medallions with saints, and nearly life-size images of Empress Anna and Tsar Alexey, who was reigning at the time the previous Tsar Bell was cast.

History

The history of Russian bell founding goes back to the 10th century, but in the medieval Russian Orthodox Church, bells were not typically rung to indicate church services, but to announce important ceremonies and celebrations, and as an alarm in case of fire or enemy attack. One of the largest of the early bells was the original Tsar Bell, cast in the 16th century. Housed in the original wooden Ivan the Great Bell Tower in the Moscow Kremlin, it crashed to the ground in a fire in the mid-17th century and was broken to pieces. 

The second Tsar Bell was cast in 1655, using the remnants of the former bell, but on a much larger scale.

After becoming Empress, Anna ordered that the pieces be cast into a new bell with its weight increased by another hundred tons, and dispatched the son of Field Marshal Münnich to Paris to solicit technical help from the master craftsmen there. However, a bell of such size was unprecedented, and Münnich was not taken seriously. In 1733, the job was assigned to local foundry masters, Ivan Motorin and his son Mikhail, based on their experience in casting a bronze cannon.

After months of preparation, casting work commenced at the end of November 1734. The first attempt was not successful, and the project was incomplete when Ivan Motorin died in August, 1735. His son Mikhail carried on the work, and the second attempt at casting succeeded on November 25, 1735. Ornaments were added as the bell was cooling while raised above the casting pit through 1737.

However, before the last ornamentation was completed, a major fire broke out at the Kremlin in May 1737. The fire spread to the temporary wooden support structure for the bell, and fearing damage, guards threw cold water on it, causing eleven cracks, and a huge  slab to break off. The fire burned through the wooden supports, and the damaged bell fell back into its casting pit. 
The Tsar Bell remained in its pit for almost a century. Unsuccessful attempts to raise it were made in 1792 and 1819. Napoleon Bonaparte, during his occupation of Moscow in 1812, considered removing it as a trophy to France, but was unable to do so, due to its size and weight. 

It was finally successfully raised in the summer of 1836 by the French architect Auguste de Montferrand and placed on a stone pedestal. The broken slab alone is nearly three times larger than the world's largest bell hung for full circle ringing, the tenor bell at Liverpool Cathedral.

For a time, the bell served as a chapel, with the broken area forming the door.

Voltaire once joked that the Kremlin's two greatest items were a bell which was never rung and a cannon (the Tsar Pushka) that was never fired.

Computational simulation of sound
In the spring of 2016, a team of University of California, Berkeley; Stanford University; and University of Michigan researchers publicly performed an electronic reproduction of how the Tsar Bell would sound if it had not been damaged during casting.
To simulate the sound of the bell, the team researched the bell's material characteristics and constructed a polygon mesh that modeled the shape of the bell. The team then used finite element analysis to compute the component frequencies of the bell when rung.
For the first public performance, a stack of twelve speakers installed below the campanile on the  UC Berkeley campus played the digital simulation of the Tsar Bell. The fundamental frequency of the sound was approximately 81 Hz. The American disk jockey DJ Spooky composed New Forms (2016), a duet for carillon and the reproduction of the Tsar Bell.

See also
Russian Orthodox bell ringing
The Liberty Bell, a damaged colonial American bell cast two decades later
List of heaviest bells

Notes

Footnotes

Citations

References
Klein, Mina. The Kremlin: Citadel of History. MacMillan Publishing Company (1973). 
Tropkin, Alexander. The Moscow Kremlin: history of Russia's unique monument. Publishing House "Russkaya Zhizn" (1980).

External links

Official website

Broken bells
Moscow Kremlin
Music in Moscow
1735 works